The 2019 Western Balkans Summit in Poznań, Poland, was the sixth annual summit within the Berlin Process initiative for European integration of Western Balkans states. Heads of government, foreign ministers, and the ministers of economy from Albania, Bosnia and Herzegovina, Kosovo, North Macedonia, Montenegro, and Serbia attended, as well as two existing EU member states from the region - Croatia and Slovenia. In addition, other EU member states including Austria, France, Germany, and Italy, as well as representatives of the European Union and the International Financial Institutions, attended to the summit. 

The summit took place on 4 and 5 July 2019.

Agenda 
The agenda there will be economy, connectivity, civil society with a focus on youth and culture, and security.

On the first day are planned the meetings of ministers the economy, the interior, and foreign affairs of the Berlin Process countries whereas on the second of the presidents and prime ministers. The meetings will be accompanied by the EU-Western Balkans Business Forum and the Civil Society Forum.

Future conferences

Notes and references
Notes:

References:

See also
Berlin Process
Southeast Europe
Stabilisation and Association Process
Central European Free Trade Agreement
Stability Pact for South Eastern Europe

2019 in politics
21st-century diplomatic conferences (Europe)
2019 in international relations
2019 conferences
Foreign relations of Croatia
Foreign relations of Albania
Foreign relations of Bosnia and Herzegovina
Foreign relations of Kosovo
Foreign relations of North Macedonia
Foreign relations of Montenegro
Foreign relations of Serbia
Foreign relations of Slovenia
International relations in Southeastern Europe
Contemplated enlargements of the European Union
Diplomatic conferences in Poland